D Venkatesh Murthy is a social worker and former BJP politician who served as 46th Mayor of Bangalore.

Career 
He was three time corporator of K. S. Eshwarappa. He was suspended from Bharatiya Janata Party in 2017. He is the longest serving Mayor of Bangalore.

References 

Karnataka politicians
Mayors of Bangalore
Living people
Year of birth missing (living people)
Bharatiya Janata Party politicians from Karnataka